HMS Dunraven was a Q-Ship of the Royal Navy during World War I.

On 8 August 1917, 130 miles southwest of Ushant in the Bay of Biscay, disguised as the collier Boverton and commanded by Gordon Campbell, VC, Dunraven spotted , commanded by Oberleutnant zur See Reinhold Saltzwedel.  Saltzwedel believed the disguised ship was a merchant vessel.  The U-boat submerged and closed with Dunraven before surfacing astern at 11:43 am and opening fire at long range.  Dunraven made smoke and sent off a panic party (a small number of men who "abandon ship" during an attack to continue the impersonation of a merchant).

Shells began hitting Dunraven, detonating her depth charges and setting her stern afire.  Her crew remained hidden letting the fires burn.  Then a 4-inch (102 mm) gun and crew were blown away revealing Dunravens identity as a warship, and UC-71 submerged.  A second "panic party" abandoned ship.  Dunraven was hit by a torpedo.  A third "panic party" went over the side, leaving only two guns manned.  UC-71 surfaced, shelled Dunraven and again submerged.  Campbell replied with two torpedoes that missed, and around 3 pm, the undamaged U-boat left that area. Only one of Dunravens crew was killed, but the Q-Ship was sinking.

The British destroyer HMS Christopher picked up Dunravens survivors and took her in tow for Plymouth, but Dunraven sank at 1:30 am early on 10 August 1917 to the north of Ushant.

In recognition, two Victoria Crosses were awarded, one to the ship's First Lieutenant, Lt. Charles George Bonner RNR, and the other, by ballot, to a gunlayer, Petty Officer Ernest Herbert Pitcher.

Captain Campbell later wrote:
"It had been a fair and honest fight, and I lost it.  Referring to my crew, words cannot express what I am feeling.  No one let me down. No one could have done better."

Notes and references

External links
  illustrated account of Gordon Campbell, "the most famous Q-ship officer", including his time with HMS Dunraven

Q-ships of the Royal Navy
World War I shipwrecks in the Atlantic Ocean
Maritime incidents in 1917
Ships sunk by German submarines in World War I
1909 ships